On the evening of 11 March 2023, clashes between students of Rajshahi University and local businesspersons occurred in Binodpur on the outskirts of the university campus in Rajshahi, Bangladesh. The clashes started over a mere issue of argument about bus fare between a university student and bus authority- where locals got engaged. The clashes injured hundreds of students, meanwhile, dozens of vendors were burnt along with the local police post. The clashes were later surpassed by law-enforcement agencies around midnight. Traffic was closed on the Rajshahi-Dhaka Highway and rail communication was interrupted due to students' blockade. 

The next day, students of the university staged protests regarding the clashes. They sieged and locked up the university's major administrative buildings and announced not to end the movement until their demands are met. Journalists were also attacked while covering the protests. Rajshahi's rail communication was closed again after the students vandalized railtrack. Although, the protests later became subsided and RU's VC Golam Shabbir Sattar announced the withdrawal of protests by students in a press conference on 13 March.

Rajshahi University closed classes for two days due to the unrest. Meanwhile, peaceful movements continued, and it later became clear how the involvement of the Chhatra League in the incident provoked the unrest.

Background

Incident

Clash with locals (11 March)

Student protests (12 & 13 March)

Aftermath

Casualties

Response

Notes

References 

 
Protests in Bangladesh
Riots and civil disorder in Bangladesh
Student protests in Bangladesh